The Worst Year of My Life is a 2015 American comedy-drama film directed by Jonathan Smith, starring Trevor St. John David, Amy Vorpahl, Nicholas Tucci and Cate Beehan.

Cast
 Trevor St. John David as Kyle
 Amy Vorpahl as Amber
 Nicholas Tucci as Todd
 Cate Beehan as Jennifer
 Nicole Day as Laura
 Brandie Posey as Rona
 Deidre Scott as Lacey
 Rachel Kerbs as Zoe

Reception
Frank Lovece of Film Journal International wrote that "With brisk, clear storytelling that moves quickly without seeming rushed, and with adroit, imaginative cuts many young filmmakers don't think to try, writer-director-editor Smith impresses with both his technical skill and with his achingly real depiction of a doomed relationship, giving us a story that's familiar yet fresh, and perhaps the most honest and naturalistic romantic film since who-knows-when."

The Hollywood Reporter wrote that while it "would have been easier to accept Kyle as a more reliable narrator—and the story is told entirely from his point of view—if the scales had been a little more balanced", it "provides a refreshing alternative that deals in realistic fashion with the sort of relationship we all find ourselves in at one time or another."

Gary Goldstein of the Los Angeles Times wrote that "Amber so often comes off as such a dreadful mate that frankly, the less of her, the better."

References

External links
 
 

American comedy-drama films
2015 comedy-drama films